Svitavsko Lake is semi-artificial lake in Bosnia and Herzegovina, between village Svitava and Neretva river. The lake is a part of Hutovo Blato complex of marshes, lakes, underground karstic wellsprings and rivers, that form a Nature Park "Hutovo Blato".

See also

List of lakes in Bosnia and Herzegovina
Deransko Lake
Krupa (Neretva)
Neretva

References

Lakes of Bosnia and Herzegovina
Hutovo Blato
Lower Horizons Hydroelectric Power Stations System
Trebišnjica